The Tour de l'Abitibi is a junior bicycle stage race taking place in the Abitibi-Témiscamingue region of Quebec, Canada. The race was first held in 1969 and had only Canadian teams. It has since become an international competition, part of the Junior Nations' Cup (Coupe des Nations Junior) and is currently the only junior-level race in North America sponsored by the Union Cycliste Internationale. A number of renowned cyclists, such as Steve Bauer, Laurent Jalabert, Bobby Julich and Andrew Hampsten, have participated in the Tour before they launched their professional careers.

Since 2000, one stage of the Tour de l'Abitibi takes place in an underground mine of Cité de l'Or, some 300 feet (91 m) below ground. Cyclists must ride through the tunnels and up the access ramp (a 17% slope) before they race through the streets of Val-d'Or.

Winners

References

External links 
 

UCI America Tour races
Cycle races in Canada
Sport in Abitibi-Témiscamingue
Recurring sporting events established in 1969
1969 establishments in Quebec